Liuaki "Lee" Hansen (born 23 July 1968) is a former professional rugby league footballer who played in the 1990s and 2000s who played for Leigh Centurions, Widnes Vikings (two spells), Wigan Warriors, Keighley Cougars, Swinton Lions, Rochdale Hornets and Blackpool Panthers.

Hansen was a Tongan international and played at the 1995 Rugby League World Cup.

Career
Hansen started his career at Leigh, making 65 appearances for the club between 1991 and 1994. Following the club's relegation at the end of the 1993–94 season, he was signed by Widnes for an estimated fee of £40,000.

In April 1997, he was signed by Wigan Warriors in exchange for Sean Long and a fee of £80,000.

In April 1998, he was signed by Keighley Cougars.

References

External links
World Cup 1995 details

1968 births
Living people
Leigh Leopards players
Widnes Vikings players
Wigan Warriors players
Keighley Cougars players
Swinton Lions players
Rochdale Hornets players
Blackpool Panthers players
Rugby league players
Rugby league props
Tonga national rugby league team players